Hakkı Yeten, (3 December 1910 – 16 April 1989) was a Turkish football player and president of the İstanbul-based football club Beşiktaş J.K., which he also coached. He is one of the most important names in Beşiktaş history.

He made Beşiktaş strong in character and club basis and has many records. He is still the football player who scored the most goals in Beşiktaş's history and scored the most in derbies. Its name is kept alive in Beşiktaş's infrastructure facilities. In addition, the east tribune of Vodafone Park, which was opened in 2016, was named Baba Hakkı Tribune.

Early life and career 
Yeten was born in 1910 at Vodina, in the Salonica Vilayet of the Ottoman Empire (present-day Greece). His father, a major in the Ottoman Army moved his family of six children to İstanbul, settling in the Beşiktaş district when Yeten was a year old. In 1914, Yeten's father was killed in the Battle of the Dardanelles. Yeten went on to attend military high school, as his two elder brothers did before him.

Yeten was attracted to football after his eldest brother, Muhtar, a multi-talented sportsman) introduced him to the sport. Yeten played in the school team, and was discovered soon by Beşiktaş J.K. club managers. He was one of the founders of Karagümrük and played for them between 1926 and 1931. In 1931, Yeten dropped out of school and joined Beşiktaş.

He played for Beşiktaş for 17 years mostly in the second striker position, contributing to its numerous victories. Declared as permanent captain, he led Beşiktaş to 8 İstanbul League Champions, 3 İstanbul Cups, one İzmir International Fair Cup, 3 National League Champions, one Turkish Champion, 2 Prime Minister Cups and 4 Private Cups. Yeten was capped only three times for the Turkey national football team due to World War II. His fame became international, and eventually the English team Arsenal showed and interest in him. However, Yeten preferred to stay in Turkey. Yeten scored 382 goals in 439 games. He quit football as a player in 1948 after fans hooted him during a match.

He was appointed coach in the 1948–1949 season, and served once again as manager in the 1950–1951 season.

Yeten studied Law, graduating in 1937. He became a legal advisor for a state owned bank. After his retirement from the active sports, he served as Vice Chairman of the Turkish Football Federation, and acted as president of Beşiktaş J.K. for three terms in 1960–1963, 1964–1966 and 1967–1968. In 1984, he backed Süleyman Seba in the elections, who became club president.

Called "Baba" ("Father") Hakkı, he was elected the first honorary president of his club before he died on April 17, 1989 in İstanbul. He was buried at the Zincirlikuyu Cemetery.

Career statistics

International goals

Honours

Player
Beşiktaş
 Istanbul Football League: 1933–34, 1938–39, 1939–40, 1940–41, 1941–42, 1942–43, 1944–45, 1945–46
 Turkish Football Championship: 1934
 Turkish National Division: 1941, 1944, 1947
 Prime Minister's Cup: 1944, 1947

Individual
 Istanbul Football League Top Scorer: 1931–32, 1932–33, 1933–34
 Turkish National Division Top Scorer: 1939, 1941, 1944
 Beşiktaş all time scorer, (382 goal)
 Beşiktaş–Fenerbahçe rivalry top goal scorer, (32 goal)
 Beşiktaş–Galatasaray rivalry top goal scorer, (29 goal)
Beşiktaş J.K. Squads of Century (Golden Team)

Manager
Beşiktaş
 Istanbul Football League: 1950–51
 Turkish Football Championship: 1951

President
Beşiktaş
 Turkish 1. Football League: 1965–66
 Turkish 1. Football League: 1966–67
 Presidential Cup: 1967

See also
List of one-club men

References

External links

 Biography in Turkish
 Beşiktaş JK website coach list in English
 Beşiktaş JK website president list in English

1910 births
1989 deaths
People from Beşiktaş
Footballers from Istanbul
People from Salonica vilayet
Macedonian Turks
Turkish footballers
Beşiktaş J.K. footballers
Turkish football managers
Beşiktaş J.K. managers
Beşiktaş J.K. presidents
Turkey international footballers
Olympic footballers of Turkey
Footballers at the 1936 Summer Olympics
Burials at Zincirlikuyu Cemetery
Association football forwards
Istanbul University Faculty of Law alumni